Scrobipalpa richteri is a moth in the family Gelechiidae. It was described by Povolný in 1968. It is found in Iran and Tunisia.

There are three dark brown-bordered marks on the forewings. The hindwings are dirty whitish.

References

Scrobipalpa
Moths described in 1968